Third Eye is the third studio album by Redd Kross. It was released by Atlantic Records on September 14, 1990. It includes "Annie's Gone", which peaked at number 16 on Billboards Alternative Songs chart. The naked masked woman on the cover of the album is Sofia Coppola. The band's guitarist Robert Hecker provided vocals on "1976", doing a Paul Stanley impersonation, which led people to believe Stanley did the singing.

Critical reception
Alex Henderson of AllMusic gave the album 4.5 stars out of 5, saying: "While some punk enthusiasts missed the old Kross, this decent though not outstanding album proves that the band was still worthwhile at the dawn of the '90s." Greg Sandow of Entertainment Weekly gave the album a grade of B, saying: "Their uncanny '60s echoes have to be taken with a mountain or two of irony, which — take your choice — gives the album depth, or else weighs the group's cute little tunes down with more significance than they can easily bear." Jeremy Clarke in Q Magazine described the album as a "potent neo-pop with bright melodies".

Track listing

Personnel
Credits adapted from liner notes.

Redd Kross
 Jeff McDonald – vocals, guitar
 Steven Shane McDonald – bass guitar, vocals
 Robert Hecker – guitar, vocals

Additional musicians
 Victor Indrizzo – drums, vocals
 Peter Levine – keyboards
 Michael Quercio – intro guitar riff (1)
 Susan Cowsill – additional vocals (5, 8), background vocals
 Vanessa Bell Armstrong – vocal solo (7), background vocals
 Mary Bernard – background vocals
 Paula Salvatore – background vocals
 Brian McCloud – percussion
 Charles Davis – trumpet
 Gregory Alper – saxophone

Technical personnel
 Michael Vail Blum – production, engineering
 Brian Jenkins – additional engineering
 Craig Doubet – additional engineering
 Bret Newman – additional engineering
 David Eaton – additional engineering
 Joe Barresi – additional engineering
 Paul McKenna – mixing
 Greg Fulginiti – mastering
 Doug Erb – sleeve design, logo
 Vicki Berndt – cover photo concept, painting, B&W photography
 Mojgan B. Azimi – cover photography

References

External links
 

1990 albums
Redd Kross albums
Atlantic Records albums
Albums recorded at Sound City Studios